Out of Hand is a 1975 honky tonk album by country music singer Gary Stewart. The singer's second album, his debut for RCA Records, reached #6 on Billboard's Country Albums chart, launching three charting singles, "Drinkin' Thing" (#10), "Out of Hand" (#4), and "She's Actin' Single (I'm Drinkin' Doubles)" (#1). The album, a departure from prevalent country styles at the time of its release, was a critical as well as a commercial success and has come to be regarded as a classic in the honky tonk genre.

Background
Stewart had already abandoned Nashville when RCA's producer Roy Dea heard him on a demo tape and approached him about making the album. Dea partnered Stewart in the studio with a number of well-established country musicians, but focused them on the honky tonk Southern rock that Stewart preferred. The resultant album, Out of Hand, was released in 1975, Stewart's RCA debut.

Reception
The album launched three charting singles. The titular song, "Out of Hand," reached #4 on the "Country Singles" chart. "Drinkin' Thing" and "She's Actin' Single (I'm Drinkin' Doubles)," two tracks penned by Grammy Award winning Wayne Carson, reached #10 and #1 respectively. The album itself was a strong seller, climbing to #6 on Billboard's "Country Albums" chart.

In addition to being commercially successfully, the album was, like all of Stewart's early work, critically well received. The year after the album's release, Time said that "all three of his albums have been gushed over by critics". Village Voice critic Robert Christgau said "the wild urgency of Stewart's voice reminds me of both Hank Williams and Jerry Lee Lewis, communicating an unrestraint that feels genuinely liberating even when Stewart himself sounds miserable." Rolling Stone gave it high praise as well, stating at the time of its release that "[w]ith practitioners like Stewart around, honky-tonk—and rockabilly—may not be dead yet" and, in a later review, describing it as a "formidable deadpan triumph". AllMusic in its review declares it "indispensable for roots music fans of any stripe."

Genre
The album is particularly prized within the honky tonk genre, regarded as a classic by a master of the genre. A year after its release, Stewart would be dubbed by Time "the current king of honkytonk". AllMusic calls it "the separate but equal third element" — with Back to the Barrooms by Merle Haggard and Honky Tonk Masquerade by Joe Ely — in forming "honky tonk's unholy trinity". Rough Guides' volume on country music declares the album "a brilliantly conceived chunk of country that stands as one of the finest honky-tonk records ever cut in Nashville", while country music critic Bill Malone went broader in calling Out of Hand "one of the greatest honky-tonk country albums ever recorded."

The album, like Stewart's live performances, had crossover appeal. Christgau characterized the album as "the best regular issue country LP I've heard in about five years", which he noted "may just mean that it's barely a country record at all." According to Nashville Scene, Stewart "updated the hillbilly existentialism of Hank Williams for the rock ’n’ roll era." The Encyclopedia of Country Music attributes Stewart's appeal to rock critics, as well as to younger music fans, to his "loud and wild" albums and concerts, but adds that these "made the Nashville establishment wary", with the country music industry at the time of the album's release focused on musicians like Olivia Newton-John and John Denver. In its obituary, CMT staunchly declared him "simultaneously more country than most country artists of his time and more of a staunch, down-and-dirty Southern rocker than almost all of the Southern rockers."

Track listing

Side one
"Drinkin' Thing" (Wayne Carson) – 2:57
"Honky Tonkin'" (Troy Seals, Don Goodman, John Bettis, Dave Gillon) – 2:42
"I See the Want To in Your Eyes" (Carson) – 2:38
"This Old Heart Won't Let Go" (Jimmie Helms) – 2:30
"Draggin' Shackles" (Gary Stewart, Nat Stuckey) – 2:25

Side two
"She's Actin' Single (I'm Drinkin' Doubles)" (Carson) – 2:46
"Back Sliders Wine" (Michael Martin Murphey) – 2:59
"Sweet Country Red" (Seals, Goodman) – 2:31
"Out of Hand" (Jeff Barry, Tom Jans) – 2:47
"Williamson County" (Gary Stewart, Mary Lou Stewart, Rick Durrett) – 3:10

Personnel

Performance

|-
| 
Harold Bradley – guitar, bass guitar
David Briggs – piano
Jerry Carrigan – drums
Pete Drake – steel guitar
Ray Edenton – guitar
Buddy Harman – drums
John Hughey – steel guitar
Jim Isbell – drums
The Jordanaires – vocals, backing vocals
Charlie McCoy – harmonica
Bob Moore – double bass
|
Weldon Myrick – steel guitar
The Nashville Edition – vocals, backing vocals
Hargus "Pig" Robbins – piano
Dale Sellers – electric guitar
Jerry Shook – guitar
Jerry Stembridge – guitar
Gary Stewart – guitar, piano, vocals
Henry Strzelecki – bass
Tommy Williams – fiddle
Bobby Wood – piano
Reggie Young – electric guitar
|}

Production
Jerry Bradley – liner notes
Herb Burnette – art direction, photography
Roy Dea – producer
Bill Vandevort – engineer

Charts

Weekly charts

Year-end charts

References

Gary Stewart (singer) albums
1975 albums
RCA Records albums